Ramondo Antonio Stallings (born November 21, 1971) is a former American football defensive end who played four seasons with the Cincinnati Bengals of the National Football League (NFL). He was drafted by the Cincinnati Bengals in the seventh round of the 1994 NFL Draft. He played college football at San Diego State University and attended Ansonia High School in Ansonia, Connecticut. He was also a member of the BC Lions, Edmonton Eskimos and Los Angeles Xtreme. Stallings was the first pick of the 2002 Arena Football League (AFL) expansion draft.

References

External links
Just Sports Stats

Living people
1971 births
Players of American football from Winston-Salem, North Carolina
American football defensive ends
Canadian football defensive linemen
African-American players of American football
African-American players of Canadian football
San Diego State Aztecs football players
Cincinnati Bengals players
BC Lions players
Edmonton Elks players
Los Angeles Avengers players
Los Angeles Xtreme players
Dallas Desperados players
21st-century African-American sportspeople
20th-century African-American sportspeople